The 1996 Peters International was a tennis tournament played on outdoor hard courts at the NSW Tennis Centre in Sydney in Australia that was part of the World Series of the 1996 ATP Tour and of Tier II of the 1996 WTA Tour. The tournament ran from 8 through 14 January 1996.

Finals

Men's singles

 Todd Martin defeated  Goran Ivanišević 5–7, 6–3, 6–4
 It was Martin's 1st title of the year and the 9th of his career.

Women's singles

 Monica Seles defeated  Lindsay Davenport 4–6, 7–6, 6–3
 It was Seles' 1st title of the year and the 38th of her career.

Men's doubles

 Ellis Ferreira /  Jan Siemerink defeated  Patrick McEnroe /  Sandon Stolle 5–7, 6–4, 6–1
 It was Ferreira's 1st title of the year and the 2nd of his career. It was Siemerink's 1st title of the year and the 8th of his career.

Women's doubles

 Lindsay Davenport /  Mary Joe Fernández defeated  Lori McNeil /  Helena Suková 6–3, 6–3
 It was Davenport's 1st title of the year and the 11th of her career. It was Fernandez's 1st title of the year and the 19th of her career.

External links
 Official website
 ATP tournament profile
 WTA tournament profile

 
Peters International, 1996